O Primo Basílio ("Cousin Bazilio") is one of the most highly regarded realist novels of the Portuguese author José Maria de Eça de Queiroz, also known under the modernized spelling Eça de Queirós. He worked in the Portuguese consular service, stationed at 53 Grey Street, Newcastle upon Tyne, from late 1874 until April 1879. The novel was written during this productive period in his career, appearing in 1878.

A bowdlerized translation of this book by Mary Jane Serrano under the title Dragon's Teeth: A Novel was published in the United States in 1889, still available as a print-on-demand title. More accurate translations have since been published, first in 1953 by the poet Roy Campbell and then in 2003 by award-winning translator Margaret Jull Costa.

Plot
Jorge, a successful engineer and employee of a ministry and Luiza, a romantic and dreamy girl, star as the typical bourgeois couple of the Lisbon society of the 19th century.

There is a group of friends who attend the home of Jorge and Luiza: Dona Felicidade, a woman suffering from gas crises and who is in love with the Councillor; Sebastião (Sebastian), a close friend of Jorge; Councillor Acácio, good scholar; Ernestinho; and maids Joana - hussy and flirty - and Juliana - an angry, envious, and spiteful woman, responsible for the conflict of the novel.

At the same time cultivating a formal and happy marriage with Jorge, Luiza still maintains friendship with a former colleague, Leopoldina - called "Bread and Cheese" for her continuous betrayal and adultery. Luiza's happiness and safety become endangered when Jorge need to travel to work at Alentejo.

After the departure of her husband, Luiza is bored with nothing to do, in the doldrums and melancholy caused by the absence of her husband, and exactly in this meantime Bazilio comes from abroad. A womanizer and a "bon vivant", he doesn't take long to win the love of Luiza (they had dated before Luiza meet Jorge). Luiza was a person with a strong romantic view of life as she usually read only novels, and Bazilio was the man of her dreams: he was rich and lived in France. The friendly love became an ardent passion and this causes Luiza to practice adultery. Meanwhile, Juliana is just waiting for a chance to blackmail Luiza.

Luiza and Bazilio send love letters to one another, but one of these letters is intercepted by maid Juliana - who starts blackmailing Luiza. Turned from a spoiled lady into a slave, Luiza starts to become sick. The ill-treatment she suffers from Juliana quickly takes her liveliness, undermining her health.

Jorge comes back and is not suspicious, as Luiza satisfies every whim of the maid while looking for all possible solutions until she finds the disinterested help of Sebastian, who sets a trap for Juliana, trying to get her arrested and ends up causing her death. It's a new era for Luzsa, surrounded by the affection of Jorge, Joan and the new maid, Mariana. However, it is too late: weakened by life that had endured under the tyranny of Juliana, Luiza is affected by a violent fever. Luiza does not notice that Bazilio hasn't replied to her letters for months, and when the postman delivers the letter at her home, it grabs Jorge's attention due to it being addressed to Luiza and being sent from France. He reads the letter and discovers the adultery of his wife. The evidence of her betrayal makes him go into despair but nevertheless, he forgives her because of the strong love he feels for Luiza and due to her fragile health. The affection and care of her husband, friends and the doctor are useless: Luiza dies.

After that, Jorge dismisses the maids and moves with Sebastian. Bazilio returns to Lisbon - where he had fled, leaving Luiza without support - and as he learns of Luizas's death, he cynically comments to a friend: "If I had brought Alphonsine before." This part closes the book revealing that Bazilio is a mean person. As they walk down the street, his friend Visconde Reinaldo admonished Bazilio for having an affair with a "bourgeois". He also said he found the relationship "absurd", after all and told that Bazilio had done what he made for "hygiene". Bazilio confirms his suspicions.

TV and film adaptations
The first film adaptation of a work of Queiroz was a 1922 adaptation of Cousin Bazilio by George Pallu, and the work was adapted to film 5 more times (including a 1959 Portuguese film, a 1935 Mexican film, the 1977 Spanish film Dios bendiga cada rincón de esta casa, a 1969 West German film and a 2007 Brazilian adaptation simply titled Primo Basílio produced/directed by Daniel Filho, with Fábio Assunção in the role of Basílio, and Débora Falabella as Luiza, Reynaldo Gianecchini as Jorge and Glória Pires as Juliana, with the action moved from 19th century Lisbon to São Paulo of the 1950s around the time of the construction of Brasília).

In 1988 the Brazilian company Rede Globo produced a television adaptation of O Primo Basílio in 35 episodes, starring the then rising star Giulia Gam and renowned actors Marcos Paulo and Tony Ramos. Although never rerun, this production contains some of the best dramatic moments delivered by the actors involved, especially the villainous Juliana, played by Marília Pêra.

Notes

External links 

 Free ebook of 1889 English translation
 Full text in Portuguese
 The 1988 TV series in the IMDb database
 The 2007 movie in the IMDb database

Novels by José Maria de Eça de Queiroz
1878 novels
Portuguese novels adapted into films
Novels set in Lisbon
Novels adapted into television shows
Literary characters introduced in 1878
19th-century Portuguese novels